The Robert Trent Jones Golf Course is Cornell University's golf course.  Designed by Cornell alumnus Robert Trent Jones and located northeast of North Campus in Ithaca, New York, the first half of the 18 hole course was opened in 1941, and the other 9 holes were added in 1954.

It has been described as "the finest of Jones’s Finger Lakes offerings".

The golf course hosts local and regional tournaments, Ivy League games, the New York State high school boy's annual golf championships and acts as a home course for Cornell's women's and men's golf teams.

References

External links
Robert Trent Jones Golf Course homepage

Golf clubs and courses designed by Robert Trent Jones
Golf clubs and courses in New York (state)
Cornell Big Red sports venues
College golf clubs and courses in the United States
1941 establishments in New York (state)